Houston is an unincorporated community in Suwannee County, Florida, United States. Houston is the location of Camp Weed & the Cerveny Conference Center and the Suwannee Country Club 

Civil Rights leader Harry T. Moore was born in Houston.

References

Unincorporated communities in Suwannee County, Florida
Unincorporated communities in Florida
Former county seats in Florida